The Lower Hunter was an electoral district of the Legislative Assembly in the Australian state of New South Wales from 1859 to 1880. It was located in the Hunter valley.

Members for Lower Hunter

Election results

References

Former electoral districts of New South Wales
1859 establishments in Australia
Constituencies established in 1859
1880 disestablishments in Australia
Constituencies disestablished in 1880